The Southern Black Forest is the highest part of the Black Forest, an area heavily transformed by ice age glaciation south of a line roughly from Freiburg im Breisgau to Donaueschingen. The term High Black Forest is not quite identical; that usually includes the highest part of the Central Black Forest, southeast of the Elz valley, as well. The Southern Black Forest Nature Park (Naturpark Südschwarzwald) also takes in this area, extending across the whole of the High Black Forest as well as several peripheral areas.

Characteristics 
Unlike the almost parallel mountain ridges and plateaux of the Northern Black Forest and the deeply incised central region, the Southern Black Forest is dominated by a central area of highland, from which most of the large valley emanate. The highest summits of the central highlands are the Feldberg and the Herzogenhorn. Towering prominently over the Rhine Plain are the Belchen, the Schauinsland and the Blauen. Other notable peaks are the Blößling and the Hochkopf in the south, and the Hochfirst in the east. Flowing away from the Feldberg area are the Wiese heading southwest, the Alb southwards, the Schwarza/Schlücht which follows the terrain descending southeast, the Wutach, still called the Seebach and Gutach, initially heading east and the headstreams of the Dreisam dropping steeply northwestwards to the "Black Forest capital" of Freiburg im Breisgau.

West of a line from the Höllental valley to the Wehra Gorge, the relief is characterised by rugged, steep-sided highlands with height differences of between 400 and 1000 metres; to the east is a land of rolling uplands with broad valleys and height differences of between 150 and 400 metres.

Gneiss is the predominant rock with a few granite intrusions. Porphyritic matrices occasionally occur in the rock formations. Unlike the Northern Black Forest, the Bunter sandstone cover with its plateau-like mountain shapes is thinner and has less influence on the relief.

The proportion of forest in the Southern Black Forest is less in comparison with the other two regions.

Landschaft elements 
Significant natural monuments:
Feldberg region with the valley heads of Zastler Loch, Napf (Alpiner Pfad) and Feldseekar
Seebach valley with the Feldsee and Titisee lakes
Schluchsee and Windgfällweiher lakes, both artificially enlarged
Belchen region and the Nonnenmattweiher
Höllental  valley and Ravenna Gorge
Wutach Gorge
Alb Gorge
Wehra Gorge
Präg Glacial Cirque
various waterfalls
Raised bogs like the Hinterzartener Moor, Urseemoor or Scheibenlechtenmoos

Significant settlements and cultural monuments:
 Roman Bath ruins of Aquae villae in Badenweiler
 Freiburg im Breisgau, also called the "capital of the Black Forest"
 Höllental Railway and Three Lakes Railway
 Abbey of Saint Peter in the Black Forest
 St. Trudpert Abbey in the Upper Münster valley
 St. Blasien with its abbey and cathedral
 St. Oswald's Chapel in Höllsteig
 Bürgeln House in the Markgräflerland
 Titisee-Neustadt in the Gutach valley (upper course of the Wutach)
 Todtnau, Schönau and Zell im Wiesental
 Wutach Valley Railway, also called the Sauschwänzlebahn ("Sow's Tail Railway")

See also 
 Südschwarzwald Cycleway

External links 

 Southern Black Forest Nature Park

Black Forest